WYME-CD, virtual channel 45 (UHF digital channel 27), is a low-powered, Class A Antenna TV-affiliated television station licensed to Gainesville, Florida, United States. Owned by New Age Media, it is sister to two full-power stations: High Springs-licensed dual CBS/MyNetworkTV affiliate WGFL (channel 28) and Gainesville-licensed NBC affiliate WNBW-DT (channel 9). The latter is actually owned by MPS Media but operated by New Age Media under a local marketing agreement (LMA). All three stations, in turn, are operated under a master service agreement by the Sinclair Broadcast Group. The stations share studios on Northwest 80th Boulevard (along I-75/SR 93) in Gainesville and transmitter facilities on Southwest 30th Avenue near Newberry.

Even though WYME-CD broadcasts a digital signal of its own, its broadcast range is limited to the immediate Gainesville area. However, it receives full-market over-the-air coverage via WNBW's fourth digital subchannel (virtual and VHF channel 9.4). On cable, WYME-CD can be seen on Cox digital channel 115 in Gainesville.

History 
WYME began operations in 1994 as W14CB, broadcasting on UHF channel 14. In early 1997, the station increased its power and changed its call letters to WJXE-LP. During this period, the station was known on-air as "TV-14" and mainly aired programming from the America One television network.

WJXE changed its callsign to WYPN-CA in 2001, when the station upgraded to Class A service and started broadcasting on UHF channel 43 (moving to channel 45 in 2003). About a year later, the America One programming was dropped and WYPN became a satellite of sister station WGFL on July 15, 2002, the same day the latter station became a CBS affiliate. This arrangement lasted until December 1, 2004, when WYPN gained the UPN affiliation and became a separate station. WYPN then positioned itself as "UPN 11", choosing to identify by its cable channel number despite broadcasting over-the-air on channel 45.

When the UPN and WB networks merged to form The CW in 2006, WYPN was made a satellite of Lake City sister station WMYG-LP, which became an affiliate of the new MyNetworkTV programming service on September 5, 2006. This arrangement was done primarily due to WMYG's over-the-air signal being channel 11 (the same as WYPN's cable number). In the months prior to the switch, WYPN omitted "UPN" from their logo and on-screen graphics and re-branded itself as "WYPN 11".

Five years later, on May 3, 2011, WYPN became an affiliate of the MeTV network. To reflect the new affiliation, the station changed its call letters to WYME-CA. This time, the station didn't go by its channel number, instead simply identifying itself as "MeTV Gainesville".

On September 25, 2013, New Age Media announced that it would sell most of its stations, including the then WYME-CA, WGFL, and WMYG-LP, to the Sinclair Broadcast Group. Concurrently, MPS Media planned to sell WNBW-DT to Cunningham Broadcasting, though Sinclair would still operate that station. On October 31, 2014, New Age Media requested the dismissal of its application to sell WYME-CA; the next day, Sinclair purchased the non-license assets of the stations it planned to buy from New Age Media and began operating them through a master service agreement.

Digital channel

References

External links
 AntennaTV.tv – official Antenna TV website
 MyCBS4.com – official WGFL website

Antenna TV affiliates
Television channels and stations established in 1994
YME-CD
Sinclair Broadcast Group
Low-power television stations in the United States